Wheatland County  is the name of two counties in North America:

In Canada:
 Wheatland County, Alberta
In the United States:
Wheatland County, Montana

See also
Wheatland (disambiguation)
Wheatland Township (disambiguation)
Rural Municipality of Wheatlands No. 163, a county-equivalent local government in Saskatchewan, Canada.